Bombing of Yugoslavia may refer to:

 Operation Retribution (1941), by Nazi Germany during the invasion of the Kingdom of Yugoslavia
 Allied bombing of Yugoslavia in World War II, various periods from 1941 to 1945
 NATO bombing of Yugoslavia, 1999